This is the discography of Pleasure P.

Studio albums

Extended plays
 Pleasure P Presents

Mixtapes

Singles

As lead artist

As featured artist

References 

Hip hop discographies